Amnon Lord (born 1952, Kibbutz Ein Dor, Israel), is an Israeli journalist with the daily newspaper Makor Rishon. 

Lord's articles and essays about media, film, and politics have been published in The Jerusalem Post, Mida, Azure, Nativ, and Achshav. Lord wrote and anchored a TV series about the beginnings of Israeli cinema. He is the author of  The Israeli Left: From Socialism to Nihilism (2003), a political and historical analysis of the Israeli Left from a personal perspective.

References

1952 births
Living people
Israeli political writers
Israeli journalists